Central Telephone Company of Virginia is a telephone company owned by CenturyLink that provides a local telephone service within the commonwealth of Virginia, USA.

History
The company was founded in 1971 under the ownership by Centel. The latter company was acquired by Sprint in 1992. The company remained in Sprint hands until 2006 when its local telephone operations were spun off as Embarq. In 2009, Embarq was acquired by CenturyTel, becoming CenturyLink in 2010.

Proposed sale
On August 3, 2021, Lumen announced its sale of its local telephone assets in 20 states to Apollo Global Management, including Virginia.

References

Lumen Technologies
Sprint Corporation
American companies established in 1971 
Telecommunications companies established in 1971
Communications in Virginia
Telecommunications companies of the United States